Morata de Jalón is a municipality located in the province of Zaragoza, Aragon, Spain.

The main attractions are the Condes de Argillo Palace (1676) and the annexed parish church.

See also
Valdejalón

References

Municipalities in the Province of Zaragoza